Aligot is a dish made from cheese blended into mashed potatoes (often with some garlic) that is made in L'Aubrac (Aveyron, Cantal, Lozère, Occitanie) region in the southern Massif Central of France.  This fondue-like dish from the Aveyron department is a common sight in Auvergne restaurants.

Background
Traditionally made with the Tomme de Laguiole (Tomme fraîche), or Tomme d'Auvergne cheese, aligot is a French country speciality highly appreciated in the local gastronomy with Toulouse sausages or roast pork. Other cheeses are also used in place of Tomme, including Cantal, mozzarella and Laguiole. The choice of cheese is important, and strongly affects the result. Tomme is not easily available outside France; many other cheeses are reported to be too strong. The cheese must be mild, with a lactic tang, but not too much salt, and melt easily. A comparison of the cheeses available in the UK found creamy (rather than the crumbly variety) Lancashire to be best, rejecting most other suggestions; other cheeses will be needed where neither Tomme nor Lancashire are available. Floury, rather than waxy, potatoes are preferable.

Ingredients
Aligot is made from mashed potatoes blended with butter, cream, crushed garlic, and the melted cheese. The dish is ready when it develops a smooth, elastic texture. While recipes vary, the Larousse Gastronomique gives the ingredients as 1 kg potatoes; 500 g tomme fraîche, Laguiole, or Cantal cheese; 2 garlic cloves; 30 g butter; salt and pepper.

Serving history
This dish was prepared for pilgrims on the way to Santiago de Compostela who stopped for a night in that region. According to legend, aligot was originally prepared with bread, and potatoes were substituted after their introduction to France. Today, it is enjoyed for village gatherings and celebrations as a main dish. Aligot is still cooked by hand in Aveyron homes and street markets. Aligot is traditionally served with Auvergne red wine.

Michel Roux Jr. and Fred Sirieix had aligot on Remarkable Places to Eat at Christmas in Bristol.

Etymology
Possibly borrowed from Occitan alicouot, possibly from Latin aliquid, possibly from Old French harigoter.

See also
 Truffade
 List of cheese dishes
 List of potato dishes

References

External links

 https://books.google.com/books?id=D_GEDwAAQBAJ&pg=PA169&lpg=PA169&dq=aligot&hl=en
 https://books.google.com/books?id=mIVKCgAAQBAJ&pg=PT1186&lpg=PT1186&dq=aligot&hl=en
 https://books.google.com/books?id=JmSbDwAAQBAJ&pg=PT435&lpg=PT435&dq=aligot&hl=en
 https://app.ckbk.com/recipe/fren62116c06s001r027/aligot
 https://app.ckbk.com/recipe/fren67413c10s001r011/aligot
 https://culturecheesemag.com/recipes/french-cheese-dip-aligot
 https://guardianbookshop.com/rick-stein-s-secret-france-9781785943881.html 
 https://www.channel4.com/programmes/sunday-brunch/articles/all/aligot-with-braised-toulouse-sausages/6108
 https://www.countrylife.co.uk/food-drink/recipes/greatest-recipes-ever-elizabeth-davids-cheesy-potato-25014

French cuisine
Occitan cuisine
Cheese dishes
Potato dishes
Foods featuring butter